Spider Boom is Uglydoll co-creator Sun-Min Kim's first solo toy project. They were originally produced by Critterbox as a limited edition run of 300 hand sewn plush dolls.

Products
Spider-Boom is the “spider of all spiders”. Every time she eats a cake, she becomes pregnant with a baby boom. The baby boom shares features of the cake Spider Boom has eaten (see Characters section below).

Characters
 Spider Boom
 Sprinkle Boom
 Melon Boom
 Choco Boom
 Whippy Boom
 Cherry Boom
 Creamy Boom
 Benga Boom
 Softy Boom
 Daisy Boom
 Cheesy Boom
 Apple Boom
 Chef spider boom

References

External links
 Sun Min Kim's Website

Art toys
Stuffed toys
2000s toys